Bosnia and Herzegovina–Montenegro relations are foreign relations between Bosnia and Herzegovina and Montenegro, two neighboring Western Balkans countries. Following the 2006 Montenegrin independence referendum Bosnia and Herzegovina recognized Montenegrian independence on 21 June 2006 and the two countries established formal diplomatic relations on 14 September 2006. Embassy of Bosnia and Herzegovina in Montenegro was opened on 10 December 2007. Both countries are aspiring members of the European Union with Montenegro being a candidate country since 17 December 2010 while Bosnia and Herzegovina is a "potential candidate country". Two countries support each other in this ambition.

Before early 1990s, both countries were constituent republics of the Socialist Federal Republic of Yugoslavia as the SR Bosnia and Herzegovina and SR Montenegro respectively. Following the breakup of SFR Yugoslavia Bosnia and Herzegovina declared independence after the 1992 independence referendum which led to Bosnian War in which Republic of Montenegro (at the time constituent federated state of the newly established FR Yugoslavia) supported Republika Srpska.

See also 
 Foreign relations of Bosnia and Herzegovina
 Foreign relations of Montenegro
 Accession of Bosnia and Herzegovina to the European Union 
 Accession of Montenegro to the European Union

References

External links 
 Embassy of Montenegro in Bosnia and Herzegovina
 Embassy of Bosnia and Herzegovina in Montenegro

 
Montenegro
Bosnia and Herzegovina